Sigfrid Mohn (30 December 1930–22 March 2015) was a Norwegian politician for the Conservative Party.

She served as a deputy representative to the Norwegian Parliament from Hordaland during the terms 1977–1981 and 1981–1985.

References

1930 births
2015 deaths
Deputy members of the Storting
Conservative Party (Norway) politicians
Hordaland politicians
Place of birth missing
Place of death missing